Turning for Home, released in February 1991 by Columbia Records, is the debut album by American country music artist Mike Reid. It produced the number-one single "Walk on Faith", as well as four more singles, three of which entered the country top twenty chart. The album peaked at No. 22 on the Country Albums chart.

Critical reception

Thom Owens wrote in his AllMusic review that, "Turning for Home is Mike Reid's most consistent release, demonstrating not only his talent for crafting a fine contemporary country song, but also his ability to deliver it. Reid had long been known for writing terrific commercial songs, but with Turning for Home, he showed that he could sing them with emotion as well as any other singer."

Alanna Nash reviews the album for Entertainment Weekly and writes, "Now comes his debut vocal album, Turning for Home, one of the best surprises of the new year. Reid is an all-around winner: His upbeat songs ("Walk on Faith") work as both thoughtful and intimate vignettes and as snappy radio rotation. And as a singer, he's alternately gruff and sensitive, with a gift for emotional directness."

People Magazine concludes their review with, "While the songs are articulate and smooth, especially the up-tempo "I'll Stop Loving You," they are easier to tune out than they might be. Vocal charisma is hard to define; nonetheless, there aren't many signs of it on this album."

Track listing

Personnel

Musicians
 Eddie Bayers — drums
 Steve Buckingham — acoustic guitar
 Larry Byrom — acoustic guitar
 Mark Casstevens — acoustic guitar
 Paddy Corcoran — Uilleann pipes
 Paul Franklin — steel guitar
 Sonny Garrish — steel guitar
 Steve Gibson — electric guitar, mandolin
 David Hungate — bass guitar
 Roy Huskey, Jr. — upright bass
 Mike Lawler — keyboards
 Albert Lee — electric guitar
 Paul Leim — drums
 Randy McCormick — piano
 Terry McMillan — percussion
 Joey Miskulin — accordion
 Phil Naish — keyboards
 Mark O'Connor — fiddle, mandolin
 Mike Reid — lead vocals, keyboards
 Tom Robb — bass guitar
 Biff Watson — acoustic guitar

Backing vocalists
 Carl Jackson
 Michael Mishaw
 Louis Dean Nunley
 John Wesley Ryles
 Scat Springs
 Harry Stinson
 Dennis Wilson
 Curtis Young

Track information and credits adapted from the album's liner notes.

Chart performance

Weekly charts

Year-end charts

Singles

References

Mike Reid (singer) albums
1991 debut albums
Columbia Records albums
Albums produced by Steve Buckingham (record producer)